Katherine Mari Stevens (born December 8, 1992) is an American actress and singer, known for finishing in eighth place on the ninth season of American Idol and starring as Karma Ashcroft in Faking It and Jane Sloan in The Bold Type.

Early life
Stevens grew up in Middlebury, Connecticut, the daughter of Mark and Clara (née Francisco) Stevens. She graduated from Pomperaug High School in Southbury in June 2010. She was named the 2009 Westbury Outstanding Teen at the Greater Watertown Scholarship Pageant.

Stevens is of Portuguese descent on her mother's side and speaks Portuguese. She was instrumental in the creation of the Evan Gagnon Memorial Scholarship Fund, which gives college scholarships to the seniors of Pomperaug High School (Evan Gagnon, who died in January 2009 at the age of two, was the son of Stevens' Spanish teacher.) She was a member of Pomperaug High School's varsity swim team for four years. Stevens first performed for an audience at the age of five years, when she sang the national anthem at a party for a politician in her hometown.

When she was seven years old, she sang "From This Moment On" at an aunt's wedding. She has long been active in her local theater community. She played Dorothy in both BSS Children's Theater and Main Street Theater's production of The Wizard of Oz. At Main Street Theater Stevens also played the role of Sharpay in High School Musical and "The Cat" in Honk. She played Nellie Forbush in Pomperaug High School's South Pacific alongside Gary Dwyer as Emile DeBeque. She performed at Carnegie Hall at the age of 13.

Career

2009–2010: American Idol

On August 13, 2009, she auditioned for American Idol in Boston, Massachusetts and sang "At Last", where all four judges (including guest judge Victoria Beckham) advanced her to Hollywood. At the Boston audition, judge Kara DioGuardi called her one of the most talented 16-year-olds she had ever seen. In Hollywood, DioGuardi made the prediction, "You could be the potential winner." On March 24, 2010, Stevens landed in the bottom 3 during elimination night, along with Paige Miles and Tim Urban. She was proclaimed safe, giving her a spot on the American Idol summer tour.

Most of the critiques the judges gave her had been with regard to her pitch, age, and song choice. In her performance of "Chain of Fools", DioGuardi told her she had found where she belonged: R&B-pop, but she needed to work on being younger. She landed in the bottom three the following night but was declared safe, putting her into the Top 9.

In her Top 9 performance of "Let It Be", all of the judges thought it was a huge improvement. Ellen stated that she wouldn't be in the bottom 3 after that performance. Simon said that she had done what she was told by being Country, while Kara and Randy disagreed, opining that she has more of an R&B sensibility. Nonetheless, her performance secured her a position in the Top 8. However, the Top 9 remained intact for another week due to the judges' save of Michael Lynche. She was eliminated from American Idol the following week on April 14, along with Andrew Garcia. Her elimination came second on the double elimination night. From July 1 to August 31, 2010, Stevens toured with the American Idols LIVE! Tour 2010. On tour, she sang "Here We Go Again" and "Fighter".

Performances

 Stevens was saved first from elimination.
 Due to the judges using their one save to save Michael Lynche, the Top 9 remained intact for another week.
 Because of the judges' save on April 7, Stevens was eliminated along with Andrew Garcia on April 14.

2010–present: Faking It and The Bold Type

After her elimination, Stevens made several appearances on talk shows. On April 16, 2010, she appeared on The Ellen DeGeneres Show where she performed "Over the Rainbow". Stevens also appeared on the Late Show with David Letterman along with Andrew Garcia, where they sang "Superhuman" by Chris Brown and Keri Hilson. She and Garcia appeared on the Wendy Williams Show where she performed "Big Girls Don't Cry".

As of early November 2010, she has written 9 songs. Stevens was a guest performer on Ídolos Portugal on December 12, 2010, where she sang "All I Want for Christmas Is You" by Mariah Carey. In June 2012, Stevens played the title role in Todrick Hall's YouTube sensation "Beauty and the Beat".

Stevens was cast to portray Nadia McConnell in Bare: A Pop Opera in the 2013 Los Angeles revival.

She won the role of Karma Ashcroft in Faking It, which premiered on April 22, 2014. In 2015, Stevens was cast as Lindsey Willows in the CSI finale movie Immortality.

In 2015, Stevens originated the role of Kathryn Merteuil (played by Sarah Michelle Gellar in the film) in Cruel Intentions: The Musical in Los Angeles.

In 2016, Stevens was cast as Jane Sloan in The Bold Type which premiered on June 20, 2017, and ran for five seasons.

Personal life
In October 2019, Stevens married musician Paul DiGiovanni after four years of dating. The couple resides in Nashville, Tennessee. In November 2022, they announced that they are expecting their first child.

Filmography

References

External links

 Katie Stevens at the Music Television
 Katie Stevens at American Idol
 

1992 births
Living people
American women singer-songwriters
American Idol participants
American child singers
American people of Portuguese descent
Child pop musicians
People from Middlebury, Connecticut
Singer-songwriters from New York (state)
21st-century American singers
21st-century American actresses
21st-century American women singers
American television actresses
American film actresses
Actresses from Connecticut
Singer-songwriters from Connecticut